, is a Japanese light novel series by Isao Miura, with illustrations by Luna. All 16 volumes have been published by Media Factory under their MF Bunko J label. A manga adaptation by Kōtarō Yamada started serialization in the seinen manga magazine Monthly Comic Alive on March 27, 2009. The first tankōbon was published June 23, 2009. A 12 episode anime adaptation by Manglobe studios aired from October 3, 2009 to December 19, 2009.

Plot
Forty-four years ago, a great war known as the Valbanill War ravaged the land. One of the war's most dangerous weapons was the Demon Contract, where humans sacrifice their bodies to become powerful demons. Realizing the damage the contracts have caused the land, the surviving nations made peace and banned the use of the Demon contracts.

Cecily Campbell is a 3rd generation Knight from Housman, one of the cities of the Independent Trade Cities, a democratic federation of cities. As her grandfather was one of the founders of the Independent Trade Cities, she is proud of her heritage and wishes to protect her city as a knight, like her father and grandfather before her. One day, she fights a mad veteran of the war causing trouble in the market, and, inexperienced and outmatched, faces defeat. But she is saved by a mysterious blacksmith named Luke Ainsworth. Cecily is impressed by Luke's katana, a weapon she has never seen before, and asks him to make one for her. Her involvement with Luke will bring her to an adventure she never expected.

Characters

Protagonists

A 3rd generation knight from The Knight Guards of Housman, the Third City of the Independent Trade Cities. Her grandfather, a former nobleman who became a knight, was one of the founders of the Independent Trade Cities during the Valbanill War. After the war ended, the Campbell family served as knights protecting the city's independence. When her father died of an illness, Cecily took up the role of the head of house, and thus became a knight. She believes strongly in justice and the protection of the city and its citizens, so much that she hesitated to kill a possessed citizen attacking the city. Cecily is a strong, smart girl with great leadership skills, evident early when she leads a group of knights and mercenaries against a band of thieves and monsters.

A blacksmith of great skill and renown and is also a talented swordsman. Possessing dark brown hair and blue eyes with his left eye made of glass (his real eye was used to create Lisa), he is arrogant, private and often insensitive to others. He lives with Lisa, who aids him in his work and often accompanies him on his business. He comes to know Cecily after saving her repeatedly from certain death. Luke wields a Japanese katana and employs a unique sword-fighting style, which is uncommon in a land where most people use a longsword and shield. He also possesses extraordinary blacksmith skills, aided by Lisa's magical powers.
Although Luke often criticizes Cecily for her inadequacies, he has slowly come to accept her. Her will to protect the city and all its citizens reminds him of Lisa Oakwood, the love of his youth. After his encounters with Cecily, Luke has also come to appreciate Lisa. He becomes increasingly worried that Lisa is living a lifestyle that he has forced upon her. After his confrontation with Lisa about her true feelings, he confesses his regret in forcing the burden of his past onto her and wishes for her to walk her own path. At the end, Luke promises that they will be together forever. Eventually, Luke falls in love with Cecily. At the end of the novels, the two marry, and have two children.

A little girl who is a live-in assistant to Luke. Lisa is actually a demon born from Lisa Oakwood, Luke's childhood best friend. Although unconfirmed, it is suggested that in order to protect Luke forever, Lisa Oakwood made a Demonic Pact before being killed by Valbanill and sacrificed herself to create Lisa.
Lisa greatly resembles Lisa Oakwood when she was young, possessing similar traits, including blonde hair, purple eyes, and elven ears. She has a sweet personality and is very polite. Lisa is also able to create a large magical fireball that enables Luke to forge katanas in the heat of battle. Lisa loves Luke and her life revolves entirely around him. She has proven herself very capable of household chores and takes delight in doing them. In addition, Lisa assists Luke in the forge. When confronted by Luke about her true feelings, Lisa reveals that while she is very happy being with Luke, it also pains her because she is only a "duplicate". She shoulders the burden of Luke's past and knows that her existence reminds Luke of it. However, Lisa confesses that her one wish in life is to remain by Luke's side forever. Three hundred years after Valbanill is sealed away, Lisa is still alive and unchanged in appearance. She is the teacher of Luke and Cecily's descendants whom she has watched over for three centuries and makes the sacred sword that finally frees Aria.

The demon sword of wind. Aria is special in that she can transform into a human. In her human form, she is beautiful, light-hearted, romantic and very feminine. Her exact age is unknown but she has memories reaching back to the Valbanill War where she was born of a demon contract on the battlefield. Her past is filled with murder and carnage and Aria has come to accept that such is her fate as a demon sword. However, after meeting Cecily, she has learned that there are those who wield swords not for the purpose of killing but protecting. Because of this, she has become incredibly fascinated with Cecily and the two form a powerful bond which enables them to become stronger. As a demon sword, Aria is able to sense other demon swords. Throughout her stay with Cecily, she meets other demon swords like herself, which prompts her curiosity. She is particularly interested in how she was born and how she is able to take a human form. Her transformation into a sword is invoked with the chant: . At the end of the novels, Aria is revealed to be the sacred sword needed to seal Valbanill away. She sacrifices herself, but Cecily promises to make a sacred sword to replace her so that she can be free. After 300 years, Luke and Cecily's descendants and Lisa, their teacher and guardian, free Aria by creating a new sacred sword to be used in her place.

Supporting characters

Leader of the Knight Guards of Housman and veteran of the Valbanill War.

Mayor of the City of Housman.

Cecily's friend who works for the city. At the end of the novels, she marries Reginald.

 A powerful and aggressive knight of Housman that initially looks down on Cecily. However, after witnessing her fight against a monster, he starts to respect her more as a knight. He wields a zweihander (a two-handed sword or greatsword). At the end of the novels, he marries Patty.

A young girl from the Empire who is an illegitimate daughter of the Emperor. As proof, she has an "E" as her middle name, which is an indication of the royal family. Initially portrayed as a spoiled and selfish girl, she is, in fact, very down to Earth, and can cook and do many household chores despite her supposed status. She struggles internally to fulfill her mother's dying wish: to be recognized as a legitimate child of the Emperor. However, when the Empire refuses to recognize her and brands her as an impostor, she is forced into the tough decision of having to face the death penalty or defect to an opposing nation. Cecily convinces her to renounce her royal status then she, along with her bodyguards, defects to the Military Nation.

One of Charlotte's companions. She wields Claymore, the Demon Sword of Earth.

One of Charlotte's companions. She wields Rhomphaia, the Demon Sword of Scarlet Light.

One of Charlotte's companions. She wields a ballock knife, the Demon Sword Assassin.

Luke's childhood friend who wanted to be a knight and protect everyone in the city. Unfortunately, she died trying to protect Luke from Valbanill. While it has not been confirmed, Cecily believes that Lisa Oakwood created the demon Lisa to stay by Luke's side forever in her place.

The maid who serves the Campbell Family. She is very strong within the domestic sphere and is able to physically overpower anyone who interferes with her duties as she perceives them. She is very loyal towards the Campbell Family and reacts strongly to anyone speaking ill of the family.

Cecily's mother. She is a calm and gentle woman. She wishes that Cecily would be more feminine. She acts as a mother figure to Charlotte while she and her bodyguards stay in the Campbell house.

Antagonists

A recently promoted commander from the Empire. He is actually the cloaked figure who is the source of most of the conflict in the series. He wields the Demon Sword of Corruption.

The mad veteran Cecily was fighting earlier in the marketplace, who then makes cameo appearances until Episode 4.

Siegfried's bodyguard and personal attendant.

A Demon Sword of the Black Flame, who, like Aria, can take human form. In her human form, she is morose and taciturn. She was in Charlotte's possession but may have come from Siegfried. She transforms into a sword by chanting .

The wielder of Elsa, the Demon Sword of Thunder. A veteran of the Valbanill War, he lost his daughter after the war when a demon attacked his home. His sanity now gone, he lives for only one thing, to get revenge on Valbanill. He comes to Luke's home seeking vengeance.

A Demon Sword of Thunder who can shape-shift to human form. In her human form, she is a quiet, sad girl. Elsa was born from the rage of the Old Knight when his daughter was slain. She has the same name as his daughter.
After his defeat, she slays him with a misericorde, fulfilling the promise made by his real daughter and dying herself from the wounds she received fighting Cecily and Aria. She transforms into a sword by chanting .

Media

Light novels

Manga
The manga was announced simultaneously with the anime adaptation, on the wraparound jacket of the fourth light novel volume. Artist Kōtarō Yamada launched the series in Media Factory's Monthly Comic Alive magazine on March 27, 2009. The ninth volume announced in February 2015 that the series would end in its tenth volume, and the last chapter was published in the magazine's March issue on January 27, 2016.

Tokyopop announced their license to the series in November 2010, with the first volume scheduled for June 7, 2011. However, the publisher shut down on May 31, 2011, with all of its titles reverting to their original owners. The series was licensed by Seven Seas Entertainment in October 2012.

Anime
An anime adaptation was announced on the wraparound jacket for the fourth light novel volume. The series was directed by Masamitsu Hidaka and written by Masashi Suzuki, with animation by the studio Manglobe. The series character designs were provided by Jun Nakai. The series aired from October 3, 2009 to December 19, 2009.

The series was licensed by Madman Entertainment in Australia and New Zealand, Manga Entertainment in the United Kingdom, and Funimation in North America. Funimation later announced that it would release the series uncut on DVD after streaming the edited version online. The series was one of the first of Funimations's relaunched collector's edition line of series, receiving a limited edition containing an art booklet. It was broadcast on the Funimation Channel starting on August 8, 2011.

Reception
The light novels have sold over 780,000 copies. Chris Schmitt wrote "Sacred Blacksmith has a very odd take on the fantasy genre, mixing moe character designs similar to K-On! with some deep, and sometimes dark, fantasy elements."

Theron Martin of Anime News Network gave the anime series a B concluding, "Although The Sacred Blacksmith stumbles in places and fails to fully develop its setting or carry through on the plot threads it establishes, it nonetheless achieves an occasional and undeniable level of sincerity in its characters' convictions and interactions and at least partly delivers on its potential. It may be far from the elite fantasy titles out there, but even within its genre you could certainly do far worse for a pleasing diversion."

References

External links
   
 The Sacred Blacksmith at Media Factory 
 The Sacred Blacksmith (Archived)—The Official Anime Website from FUNimation
 

2007 Japanese novels
2009 anime television series debuts
2009 manga
Japanese adventure novels
Anime and manga based on light novels
Japanese fantasy novels
Funimation
High fantasy anime and manga
Light novels
Manglobe
Media Factory manga
MF Bunko J
Kadokawa Dwango franchises
Seinen manga
Seven Seas Entertainment titles
Sword and sorcery anime and manga